Wayan Limbak (1897/c 1910 – September 5, 2003) was an Indonesian dancer, who worked with Walter Spies to popularize the Indonesian dance, known as kecak.

References

External links
"Wayan Limbak -- Balinese Dancer, 106". New York Times - September 14, 2003

Year of birth unknown
2003 deaths
Indonesian male dancers
Indonesian centenarians
Balinese people
Indonesian Hindus
Year of birth uncertain
Men centenarians